Matt Johnson (born November 23, 1975) is a Canadian former professional ice hockey left winger. He played parts of 10 seasons as an enforcer in the National Hockey League with the Los Angeles Kings, Atlanta Thrashers and the Minnesota Wild. Johnson was born in Welland, Ontario, and raised in nearby Fenwick. He was known by Wild fans as Moose.

Playing career
Due to his great size and power forward abilities, many NHL scouts took great interest in Johnson. He was drafted in the second round, 33rd overall, by the Los Angeles Kings in the 1994 NHL Entry Draft.

After two-plus seasons in the Ontario Hockey League with the Peterborough Petes, Johnson joined the Kings during the 1994–95 season. During the 1998–99 season, Johnson was suspended for twelve games for sucker-punching Jeff Beukeboom in the back of the head. He remained a member of the Kings until he was chosen by the Atlanta Thrashers in the 1999 NHL Expansion Draft. On November 17, 1999, Johnson scored 10 seconds after teammate Andrew Brunette in a 5-4 victory over the Tampa Bay Lightning to mark the then two quickest goals in Franchise history. After just one season with the Thrashers, he joined another expansion team, the Minnesota Wild, for the 2000–01 season. He was named team captain of the Wild in December 2002. Johnson played four seasons with the Wild and, to date, has had no NHL experience since the end of the 2003–04 season.

During the 2004-05 NHL lockout, Johnson decided that he did not want to play hockey anymore. In an interview with a Minnesota newspaper, he explained that his shoulder (which was reconstructed during that off-season) had been feeling great and after a few months of no hockey, he would wake up in the morning with no pain or constant aches like he had when he played. He decided that he did not want to go back to being an enforcer, and a few days later, the Wild organization bought out his contract and today he remains unofficially retired.

Johnson moved in with his parents at their farm in Pelham, Ontario during the 2005 lockout. Johnson struggled with difficulties adjusting to life after hockey. His erratic behavior eventually led to his family attempting to enroll him in rehab in spring of 2006. As of December 2017, Johnson is estranged from his family and homeless, his last known location living on the streets of Santa Monica, California. For nearly a decade, Johnson had been missing but resurfaced on December 31, 2017 in an altercation at a Santa Monica Denny's.

In his NHL career, Johnson appeared in 473 games, tallying 23 goals and adding 20 assists. In addition, he recorded 1,523 penalty minutes.  He also appeared in 16 Stanley Cup playoff games, going scoreless with 31 penalty minutes.

Career statistics

References

External links

1975 births
Living people
Atlanta Thrashers players
Canadian ice hockey left wingers
Sportspeople from Welland
Los Angeles Kings draft picks
Los Angeles Kings players
Minnesota Wild players
Peterborough Petes (ice hockey) players
Phoenix Roadrunners (IHL) players
Ice hockey people from Ontario